Kamil Černý (born 20 November 1985) is a Czech professional ice hockey defenceman currently playing for HC Tábor of the Czech 2.liga.

Černý played 60 games in the Czech Extraliga, playing for HC Karlovy Vary from 2008 to 2010, and for HC Litvínov from 2012 to 2017. He moved to HC Tábor on 10 August 2017, and has played an alternate captain for the team since.

References

External links

1985 births
Living people
Motor České Budějovice players
Czech ice hockey defencemen
HC Karlovy Vary players
HC Litvínov players
HC Most players
People from Tábor
Piráti Chomutov players
HC Slovan Ústečtí Lvi players
HC Tábor players
Sportspeople from the South Bohemian Region